Joseph Gordon Mueller (December 10, 1922 – September 7, 2006) was an American relief pitcher in Major League Baseball who played briefly for the Boston Red Sox during the  season. He was born in Baltimore, attended Loyola College in Maryland, and served in the United States Navy during World War II.

Mueller's ten-year pro career began in 1941 with his hometown Orioles, then a minor league baseball franchise in the International League. He made his major-league debut nine years later as a member of the Red Sox' early season roster. In eight relief appearances, three in April and July and two in May, Mueller allowed eight runs and 11 hits, giving 13 base on balls and registering one strikeout in seven full innings pitched for a 10.29 ERA. He did not have a decision or a save. He also spent part of that year at Triple-A Louisville, then finished his pro career in 1952. After baseball, he had a long and successful career in commercial real estate in his native state.

Mueller died at the age of 83 in Timonium, Maryland where he lived.

See also
1950 Boston Red Sox season
Boston Red Sox all-time roster

References

External links
Baseball Reference
Retrosheet

1922 births
2006 deaths
Baltimore Orioles (IL) players
Baseball players from Baltimore
Boston Red Sox players
Businesspeople from Maryland
Lancaster Red Roses players
Louisville Colonels (minor league) players
Loyola Greyhounds baseball players
Major League Baseball pitchers
Ottawa A's players
People from Timonium, Maryland
Scranton Red Sox players
Wilkes-Barre Barons (baseball) players
20th-century American businesspeople
United States Navy personnel of World War II